Mnemba Island is a single small island located about 3 km off the northeast coast of Unguja, the largest island of the Zanzibar Archipelago, Tanzania, opposite Muyuni Beach. It is surrounded by an oval reef seven by four kilometres in extent. These reefs have been declared a marine conservation area. Mnemba Island and its reef are sometimes called Mnemba Atoll which is incorrect because an atoll is an island that encircles a lagoon, which is not the case for Mnemba Island.

Mnemba Island is a popular scuba diving site, with a wide variety of corals and associated species, as well as occasional sightings of larger species such as turtles and dolphins. Calm conditions are most frequent in November and March, with maximum visibility. The island itself is privately owned and can be visited only as a guest at a price of US$1155 to US$1600 per person per night (2015 rates). As Mnemba is a private island, non-guests are not permitted to land on the island. The island has a 200-meter exclusion zone around the island within which non-guests are not permitted.

Mnemba Island is a 90-minute drive from Stone Town across the main Zanzibar Island, before a twenty-minute boat crossing.

The marine reserve comprises four distinct habitats which are home to a diverse array of Indian Ocean wildlife:
 Nesting place of threatened green sea turtles (monitoring and protection project has been underway since 1996)
 Humpback whales (July to September)
 Three species of dolphin
 Whale sharks (the world's largest fish)
 Migratory and resident shore birds feed and roost on the Island
 Approximately 600 species of coral reef fish.

Green sea turtles can be seen laying their eggs on the beaches between February and September.

References
 Finke, J. (2006) The Rough Guide to Zanzibar (2nd edition). New York: Rough Guides.

External links

 Government of Zanzibar

Zanzibar Archipelago
Uninhabited islands of Tanzania
Private islands of Africa